The Răchita is a right tributary of the river Borod in Romania. It flows into the Borod in the village Borod.

References

Rivers of Romania
Rivers of Bihor County